Sonchis of Saïs or the Saïte (Sō̂nkhis o Saḯtēs;  BC) was an Egyptian priest, who is mentioned in Greek writings as relating the account of Atlantis. His status as a historical figure is a matter of debate.

The Platonic dialogues Timaeus and Critias, written around 360 BC, relate (through the voice of Critias) how the Athenian statesman Solon (638–558 BC) traveled to Egypt and in the city of Sais encountered the priests of the goddess Neith. A very aged priest tells him that 9000 years earlier, Athens had been in conflict with the great power of Atlantis, which was then destroyed in a catastrophe.

Plato's dialogue does not mention a name for the priest, but Plutarch (46–120 AD), in his Life of Solon identified the aged priest as Sonchis:

Plutarch gives a more detailed description on the Greek philosophers who visited Egypt and received advice by the Egyptian priests in his book On Isis and Osiris. Thus, Thales of Miletus, Eudoxus of Cnidus, Solon, Pythagoras, (some say Lycurgus of Sparta also) and Plato, traveled into Egypt and conversed with the priests. Eudoxus was instructed by Chonupheus of Memphis, Solon by Sonchis of Saïs and Pythagoras by Oenuphis of Heliopolis.

References

Atlantis
6th-century BC clergy
Sais
Egypt in Greek mythology